The red-bellied dasyure or red-bellied marsupial shrew (Phascolosorex doriae) is a species of marsupial in the family Dasyuridae endemic to West Papua. Its natural habitat is subtropical or tropical dry forests.

References

External links

Dasyuromorphs
Mammals of Western New Guinea
Mammals described in 1886
Taxa named by Oldfield Thomas
Taxonomy articles created by Polbot
Marsupials of New Guinea